Ninh Giang is a district (huyện) of Hải Dương province in the Red River Delta region of Vietnam.

As of 2003 the district had a population of 148,120. The district capital lies at Ninh Giang.

References

Districts of Hải Dương province